

Fixtures

Match 2

Match 6

Match 8

Match 12

Match 15

Match 18

Match 24

Match 29

Match 32

Match 40

Ladder

References

External links
 Official website of the Brisbane Heat
 Official website of the Big Bash League

Brisbane Heat seasons